Thelonious is a 10" LP by American jazz pianist and composer Thelonious Monk, performed by the Thelonious Monk Trio. It was originally released in 1953 as the first of five 10" LP studio albums by Monk for Prestige (PrLP 142), and was later expanded into the 12-inch album Thelonious Monk Trio with the addition of two non-chronological later tracks. It has rarely been re-released in its original format, although it was included in a boxed set by Craft Records in a limited edition in 2017.

The album features his earliest recordings for the Prestige label, performed with bassist Gary Mapp, and alternately Art Blakey and Max Roach on drums.

Track listing
All compositions by Thelonious Monk, except where noted.

Side A:
 "Little Rootie Tootie" - 3:06  
 "Sweet and Lovely" (Gus Arnheim, Jules LeMare, Harry Tobias) - 3:33  
 "Bye-Ya" - 2:46  
 "Monk's Dream" - 3:07
Side B: 
 "Trinkle, Tinkle" - 2:49  
 "These Foolish Things" (Harry Link, Holt Marvell, Jack Strachey) - 2:46  
 "Bemsha Swing" (Thelonious Monk, Denzil Best) - 3:10  
 "Reflections" - 2:48

Notes
Tracks 1-4 recorded on October 15, 1952
Tracks 5-8 recorded on December 18, 1952
Recording engineer: unknown, Beltone Studios, New York City

Singles and EPs
A notable feature of these eight recordings is their brevity.  Like the Blue Note recordings before them, it appears these performances were kept short such that they could be simultaneously released on 45 and 78 rpm singles and EPs.  And, in fact, most of these selections were released in that format at the time, as well:

PR 795   Thelonious Monk Trio - Sweet And Lovely / Bye-Ya
PR 838   Thelonious Monk Trio - Trinkle, Tinkle / These Foolish Things
PR 850   Thelonious Monk Trio - Little Rootie Tootie / Monk's Dream
PREP 1329 Thelonious Monk Trio (EP with same contents as Side A of the 10" LP)
45-162 Thelonious Monk Trio - Blue Monk / Bye-Ya (re-released 1959)

The next batch of recordings Monk produced for Prestige saw him beginning to take advantage of the longer LP format.

Personnel
Thelonious Monk -  piano 
Art Blakey - drums (tracks 1-4)
Gary Mapp - bass
Max Roach - drums (tracks 5-8)
 an uncredited person plays a shaker (in son clave rhythm) on "Bye-Ya"

References

Thelonious Monk albums
1953 albums
Prestige Records albums